Ioannis Georgiadis (29 March 1876 – 17 May 1960) was a Greek fencer.  He competed at the 1896 Summer Olympics in Athens, the 1906 Intercalated Olympics and the 1924 Summer Olympics in Paris.

In 1896 Georgiadis competed in the men's sabre event.  In the five-man, round-robin tournament, Georgiadis won all four of his matches.  He defeated Georgios Iatridis, Adolf Schmal, Telemachos Karakalos, and Holger Nielsen in succession to win first place.

Georgiadis later became Professor of Forensic Medicine and Toxicology at the Medical School of the National and Kapodistrian University of Athens.

References

External links

1876 births
1960 deaths
Greek male sabre fencers
Olympic gold medalists for Greece
Olympic fencers of Greece
Olympic medalists in fencing
Medalists at the 1896 Summer Olympics
Medalists at the 1906 Intercalated Games
Fencers at the 1896 Summer Olympics
19th-century sportsmen
Fencers at the 1906 Intercalated Games
Fencers at the 1924 Summer Olympics
Academic staff of the National and Kapodistrian University of Athens
Sportspeople from Tripoli, Greece